Nutri-Grain is a brand of breakfast cereal and breakfast bar made by the Kellogg Company. In Australia and New Zealand Nutri-Grain is a breakfast cereal made from corn, oats, and wheat. The pieces are shaped like bricks.

In the United States, Canada, the United Kingdom and Ireland the Nutri-Grain name is used for soft breakfast bars.

History

The breakfast cereal in its original "block and hole" shape was introduced in Australia in 1976, and later in 1981 consisting of flakes without added sugar. There were four varieties initially (rye, corn, barley, and wheat); later these were reduced to corn and wheat, and finally the corn line was completely discontinued. There are various Nutri-Grain Bars made from the breakfast cereal bonded together, available in the markets where the cereal is available. The bars became popular in the 1990s as an "on-the-go" food.

In 2013, Nutri-Grain breakfast drinks were added to the line of cereals for the Australian market.

UK products
In the UK, Nutri-Grain bars are around one-third cereals (mainly wheat-flour) and around ten percent fruit. Breakfast bars are a similar product to the muesli bar or granola bar.

Breakfast bars
Apple
Strawberry
Blueberry

Breakfast Bakes range (formerly Elevenses) 
Raisin
Ginger
Golden Oat
Chocolate Chip

Breakfast biscuits
Cereal & Milk
Oats & Honey
Fruit & Fibre

Canada products

Cereal bars
Strawberry
Raspberry 
Mixed Berry
Blueberry
Apple Cinnamon

Fruit crunch
Apple Crisp
Strawberry Parfait

Soft Bakes
Mixed Berry
apple cinnamon
strawberry
Blueberry
strawberry and Greek yogurt
Raspberry
Chocolate Raspberry
Pumpkin Spice (limited time)

US products

Breakfast bars
Cherry
Raspberry
Chocolate Raspberry 
Blackberry
Apple Cinnamon
Blueberry
Mixed Berry
Strawberry
Strawberry Yogurt
Cinnamon

Australian products

Breakfast cereal
Nutri-Grain Original
Nutri-Grain EDGE Oat Clusters

Bars
Nutri-Grain Original
Nutri-Grain EDGE

Health

Nutri-Grain received four stars out of five on the Australian Government's health star ratings.

References

External links
 

Kellogg's cereals
Cereal bars
Products introduced in 1981